Johann Ritter von Oppolzer (4 August 1808 – 16 April 1871) was an Austrian physician born in Nové Hrady, Bohemia. He was the father of the astronomer Theodor von Oppolzer (1841–1886).

In 1835 he earned his medical doctorate at the University of Prague, and later worked as a university professor at Prague (from 1841), Leipzig (from 1848) and Vienna (from 1850), where he also served as rector in 1860/61. In 1863, he was elected a foreign member of the Royal Swedish Academy of Sciences.

Oppolzer was an advocate of holistic diagnostics and therapy in his approach to medicine. He was also an important influence in the career of renowned otologist Adam Politzer.

Selected writings 
 Vorlesungen über spezielle Pathologie und Therapie, (Lectures on Special Pathology and Therapy); 2 volumes, 1866/1872.

External Reference 
  biography of Johann von Oppolzer @ AEIOU Encyclopedia
 Pagel: Biographical Dictionary (translated biography)

1808 births
1871 deaths
People from Nové Hrady
People from the Kingdom of Bohemia
German Bohemian people
19th-century Austrian physicians
Academic staff of Charles University
Academic staff of Leipzig University
Academic staff of the University of Vienna
Members of the Royal Swedish Academy of Sciences
Bohemian nobility
Austrian knights
Austrian people of German Bohemian descent